Hopea micrantha is a tree in the family Dipterocarpaceae. The specific epithet micrantha means "small flower".

Description
It has buttresses and stilt roots. The bark is smooth.

Distribution and habitat
Hopea micrantha is native to Borneo. The species was present in Sumatra, but its presence there is now uncertain.

Conservation
Hopea micrantha has been assessed as critically endangered on the IUCN Red List. It is threatened by land conversion for tree and palm oil plantations and by logging for its timber. The species is found in some protected areas.

References

micrantha
Flora of Borneo
Plants described in 1860
Taxonomy articles created by Polbot